Commodore William Lisle was a Royal Navy officer who became Commander-in-Chief of the East Indies Station.

Naval career
Lisle was given command of HMS Severn and saw action when escorting a convoy in the Leeward Islands in 1746. None of the ships in the convoy were taken by the attacking French force and Lisle's conduct was such that he was rewarded with the command of HMS Vigilant in 1747, retaining it as his flagship for his deployment to the East Indies. He was appointed Commander-in-Chief of the East Indies Station in 1750 and remained in post until 1752.

References

Royal Navy officers